The Theaterhochschule Leipzig was a theatre school in Leipzig, Saxony, Germany, which existed from 1953 to 1992. The official name was Theaterhochschule "Hans Otto" Leipzig.

History 
From the late 1960s, Bertolt Brecht was a teacher. In 1967 it was named after the actor  whom the Nazis had murdered in 1933.

The institution was dissolved per the Sächsisches Hochschulstrukturgesetz on 10 April 1992. The acting department became a faculty of the Hochschule für Musik und Theater "Felix Mendelssohn Bartholdy", while theatre studies formed a new institute of the Leipzig University.

Alumni 
 Eberhard Esche (1933–2006), actor
 Jürgen Holtz (1932–2020), actor on stage and in film, artist and author
 Julia Jäger (born 1970), actress
 Sonja Kehler (1933–2016), actress and chanson singer
 Volkmar Kleinert (born 1938), actor, recitator
 Harry Kupfer (1935–2019), opera director, recipient of the National Prize of the GDR
 Ute Lubosch (born 1953), actress, stage director
 Hans-Peter Minetti (1926–2006), actor
 Ulrich Mühe (1953–2007), actor in film and theatre,  Academy Award for Best Foreign Language Film
 Günther Rücker (1924–2008), writer, playwright, film director, recipient of the National Prize of the GDR
 Jörg Schüttauf (born 1961), actor, recipient of the Grimme-Preis
 Peter Sodann (born 1936), actor, stage director, intendant
 Carina Wiese (born 1968), actress
 Monika Woytowicz (born 1944), actress

Literature 
 Gerhard Neubauer (ed.): „… dann gehst du aber auf 'ne richtige Schule!“ Fünfzig Jahre Schauspieler-Ausbildung in Leipzig 1953–2003. Hochschule für Musik und Theater „Felix Mendelssohn Bartholdy“, Leipzig 2003.

External links 
 Theaterhochschule Leipzig (in German) Leipzig-Lexikon

Theaterhochschule Leipzig
Drama schools in Germany
Defunct drama schools
Education in Leipzig
Educational institutions established in 1953
1953 establishments in Germany